Irene Miller (1880-1964) was a British screenwriter active during the silent era. She began her career as a journalist before getting work as a screenwriter, and she eventually became chief of the department at Will Barker's studio; later on, she became a studio publicist.

Selected filmography 

 The Children of Gibeon (1920)
 The Night Riders (1920)
 Edge O' Beyond (1919)
 The Lamp of Destiny (1919) 
 The Life of a London Actress (1919) 
 Her Lonely Soldier (1919)
 Jo the Crossing Sweeper (1918) 
 On Leave (1918) 
 Meg o' the Woods (1918) 
 Mrs. Cassell's Profession (1915)

References 

British women screenwriters
1880 births
1964 deaths
20th-century British screenwriters